Peanut Corporation of America (PCA) was a peanut-processing business which is now defunct as a result of one of the most massive and lethal food-borne contamination events in U.S. history. PCA was founded in 1977 and initially run by Hugh Parnell, father of Stewart Parnell, with him and two other sons. The company was sold in 1994–1995 with the senior Parnell retiring, and with Stewart Parnell and others remaining with the new company as consultants. In 2000, control of PCA returned to Stewart Parnell via a private sale. Over this history, PCA came to operate processing facilities in Blakely, Georgia, Suffolk, Virginia, and Plainview, Texas, providing peanut and peanut butter products primarily to the "institutional food" market (schools, prisons and nursing homes), to food manufacturers for use in cookies, snacks, ice cream, and dog treats, and to other markets.

PCA permanently halted its operations after it was found to be the source of a massive Salmonella outbreak in the U.S., during late 2008 and early 2009. By 2007, prior to closing its doors, PCA had grown to 90 employees and was doing $25 million in annual sales. It has been estimated to have been manufacturing roughly 2.5% of processed peanuts in the U.S. at that time. The 2008 contamination followed a long history of food quality issues. There had been concerns about sanitation at the company since at least the mid-1980s, when the company was run by its founder, Stewart Parnell's father, Hugh Parnell. In addition, in the years just prior to its sale and Hugh Parnell's retirement, PCA was sued: by American Candy Company in 1990, and by Zachary Confections Inc. of Frankfort, Indiana in 1991, after discovery that PCA's peanut products exceeded the FDA tolerance level for aflatoxin, a mold-derived toxin common to peanuts. Moreover, as a result of the coming contamination event, investigations would show that some PCA processing was being done without FDA knowledge and oversight, and other food handling and processing areas had gone long periods without federal inspection.

In late 2008 and early 2009, as a result of the Salmonella contamination event, 9 people died and at least 714 people fell ill, all from food poisoning after eating products containing contaminated peanuts. This contamination triggered the most extensive food recall in U.S. history up to that time, involving 46 states, more than 360 companies, and more than 3,900 different products manufactured using PCA ingredients. The contamination and recall had immediate major ramifications for the market of this set of farm products. On February 13, 2009, Peanut Corporation of America ceased all manufacturing and business operations, and filed for Chapter 7 bankruptcy liquidation. As of February 2009, a federal criminal investigation was continuing, and at least a dozen civil lawsuits had been filed. In September 2015, Stewart Parnell was sentenced to 28 years in federal prison for his role in the nationwide outbreak. Stewart's brother, Michael Parnell, was sentenced 20 years in prison.

Scope of business

Hugh Parnell Sr. founded Parnell's Peanuts, in Gorman, Texas in 1977 selling to consumers, bakeries and manufacturers (candy, ice cream, and snacks). In 1990 the FDA found PCA distributing peanuts with high levels of aflatoxins, caused by mold that grows in nuts and seeds.  In 1992 the American Candy Company sued PCA for lost inventory that  had used PCA nuts contaminated with aflatoxins. The company was sold in 1994–1995, with the senior Parnell retiring, and with Stewart Parnell and others remaining with the new company as consultants. In 2000, control of PCA returned to Stewart Parnell via a private sale. Over its history, PCA came to operate processing facilities in Blakely, Georgia, Suffolk, Virginia, and Plainview, Texas, providing peanuts, peanut butter, peanut meal, and peanut paste to an institutional food market—to schools, prisons, and nursing homes—as well as to low-budget retail outlets such as dollar stores and to food manufacturers for use in cookies, snacks, ice cream, and dog treats. It has been estimated to have been manufacturing roughly 2.5 percent of processed peanuts in the U.S. at its height, with 90 employees and $25 million in annual sales in 2007. The company filed for Chapter 7 bankruptcy and permanently halted its processing and sales operations, after being found to be the source of a massive Salmonella outbreak in the United States beginning in 2008.

Aflatoxin suits

PCA was sued in 1990 by the American Candy Company after the FDA discovered that PCA's peanut butter exceeded the FDA tolerance level for aflatoxin, a mold-derived toxin common to peanut production; American Candy had turned the peanut butter into 8,000 unshipped cases of "kisses" for Wal-Mart. Another lawsuit was brought by Zachary Confections Inc. of Frankfort, Indiana, in 1991, after a 40,020-pound shipment of nuts from PCA was also found to have an unacceptably high level of aflatoxin.

Nestlé inspection
In January 2006, Nestlé completed an onsite audit of PCA's Plainview plant, and gave it a "Does Not Meet Standards" score on nearly all 40 inspection areas. Months after, PCA hired Kenneth Kendrick as assistant plant manager at the Plainview plant.

FDA oversight before 2008

In 2001, FDA inspectors also found that products from the Blakely plant were potentially exposed to insecticides, according to a report obtained by the Associated Press.

According to Virginia state inspection records, the PCA blanching operations in Suffolk, Virginia, had some of the same food safety problems that would be found in the company's Georgia plant (see below). Inspection in 2008 found mold on "totes" holding peanuts, counted 43 mouse droppings on the floor, and saw a live bird walking and flying inside the warehouse.

Salmonella contamination of products

Discovery and impact
In late 2008 and early 2009, nine people died and at least 714 people in 46 states, half of them children, fell ill due to food poisoning from eating products containing contaminated peanuts, according to the Centers for Disease Control and Prevention (CDC). Among persons with available information, 23% reported being hospitalized. The real numbers were believed to be much higher, since for every reported case of salmonellosis, on average, another 38 or so cases go unreported, according to the CDC. A combination of epidemiological analysis and laboratory testing by state officials in Minnesota and Connecticut, the Food and Drug Administration (FDA), and the CDC enabled the FDA to confirm that the sources of the outbreak of illnesses caused by Salmonella typhimurium were peanut butter, peanut paste, and peanut meal produced by the Peanut Corporation of America (PCA) at its Blakely, Georgia, processing plant.

On February 7, 2009, Oregon officials confirmed the first case of salmonellosis in a dog that had eaten biscuits contaminated with the PCA-produced peanut products.

The company issued a statement categorically denying the allegations; in January 2009, it shut down production and laid off 50 employees at the Blakely plant.

Recall
This contamination event triggered the most extensive food recall ever in U.S. history. As of April 22, 2009, it involved at least 361 companies and 3,913 different products manufactured using PCA ingredients. The recall included everything produced at the Blakely plant since January 1, 2007, as well as everything ever produced at the Plainview, Texas, plant. Products supplied for some school lunches were pulled, and the Federal Emergency Management Agency (FEMA) even recalled emergency meals sent after a massive ice storm. (Since the storm left many without power, the United States Postal Service went door-to-door in Kentucky to warn residents and hand out 600,000 flyers from FEMA.) Food banks nationwide had to discard thousands of pounds of food in time of high demand from millions of U.S. families in need.

The recall did not involve major-brand peanut butters, since PCA primarily served only low-budget and institutional providers, but many consumers reacted by avoiding peanut products altogether, driving down the sales of all brands of peanut butter by nearly 25%.
This caused great harm to the industry and farmers, already suffering from low prices due to the 2008 bumper crop and the deepening economic crisis. Early estimated losses to the U.S. peanut industry because of this outbreak would be on the order of $1 billion.

2009 investigations

Georgia

Journalistic
Following initial reporting of the contamination's source, reporters and investigators began taking a careful look at the sites run by PCA. The Washington Post reported on February 14, 2009, the view of David Brooks, a buyer for a snack company that had visited PCA facilities in the mid-1980s (when PCA was under Hugh Parnell's control), that "everybody in the peanut industry" in the states involved (Georgia, Virginia, and Texas) knew of the serious sanitation issues associated with PCA; Brooks went on to state that PCA was "a time bomb waiting to go off."

Former employees interviewed by the Chicago Tribune stated that conditions in the plant were "filthy and nasty", and that they would never eat the peanut butter or allow their children to eat it. One employee remembered seeing a family of baby mice in a tote of peanuts, and others recalled having to step over standing water inside the building after heavy rain. Another former employee told CBS News that he saw a rat dry-roasting in a peanut area. Another told ABC News that workers had no idea the company had positive Salmonella tests because "that information is not for the average employee to see."

Food and Drug Administration
Food and Drug Administration (FDA) inspectors reported, following a two-week inspection of the Blakely, Georgia, plant in January 2009, that the company had information that its peanut-butter products were tainted with Salmonella, but shipped them anyway after "retesting" them.  This occurred at least 12 times in 2007 and 2008. FDA inspectors also found mold growing on the plant's ceiling and walls, foot-long gaps in its roof, dead insects near peanuts, and holes in the plant big enough for rodents to enter. Inspectors found that the company also did not clean its equipment after finding contamination, and did not properly segregate raw and finished products. In 2007, the company shipped chopped peanuts on two occasions even after Salmonella was confirmed by private lab tests. The company had previously refused to divulge production test records until federal officials invoked the food safety provisions of a federal antiterrorism law (the 2002 Public Health Security and Bioterrorism Preparedness Response Act). As a result of this refusal and the incident in general, the Georgia State Senate passed a bill requiring peanut product manufacturers to report any contamination within 24 hours, failing which felony charges would result.

On February 6, 2009, the FDA reported that the company shipped tainted products under three conditions: (1) without retesting, (2) before the retest results came back from an outside company, and (3) after a second test showed no bacterial contamination. In all three cases, the initial positive result means that the product should have been destroyed. Food safety experts say Salmonella can live in pockets of peanut butter, so that one batch could test both negative and positive. In that case, it should have been destroyed, they said.

Documents released February 11 by the U.S. House Energy and Commerce Committee showed that the company shipped products to customers even before receiving results of Salmonella tests, and the company stopped using a private laboratory because too many tests done there showed contamination. A lab tester told the House panel that the company discovered Salmonella at its Blakely plant as far back as 2006.

Texas
The company had operated a plant in Gorman, where the company originally started in 1977. David Brooks, the snack food company buyer interviewed by The Washington Post after the Salmonella outbreak, said that he inspected this plant three times on behalf of his company in the mid-1980s to determine whether to buy peanuts from PCA. The plant failed his private inspection each time for what he called "just filthy" conditions, including dusty beams, leaky roofs, and birds flying through the building. The Gorman operations transferred to Plainview when Hale County officials issued $2 million in tax-free revenue bonds to help the company convert a long vacant Jimmy Dean sausage factory into a peanut plant. Local officials, including a county health inspector, toured the new plant and approved its opening, although the state said it never knew the plant existed. The plant was located along a major highway, across from a large Wal-Mart distribution center; it had four highly visible signs in the front and a billboard bearing a picture of a peanut. A state inspector who drove by the plant "a few times" on his way to other inspections never stopped because it was not on his list. State officials said the company was solely to blame for failing to obtain the food manufacturer's license when the Plainview plant opened.

The company's plant in Plainview opened in March 2005 and employed 30 people, but was never licensed in that state as a food manufacturing facility; the state had not done any inspections until the problems with the Georgia plant became news.  The Texas plant blanched, dry- and oil-roasted, and chopped peanuts, then shipped them to food companies across the country. The plant had been certified for organic production in November 2005, based on what state officials later called incomplete information obtained by an inspector with the Texas Department of Agriculture. However, the company failed to apply for a Texas health certificate, which would have triggered a visit by state inspectors. State health officials were not aware the plant existed until the company released a list of its plants around the country.

The Texas inspection in January 2009 found some unsanitary conditions, such as unclean sections of a peanut-roasting line. It also reported that several internal company laboratory tests dating back to November had found no Salmonella or other contaminants. However, on February 10, 2009, company officials announced that the Texas plant had been shut down, after samples taken on February 4 tested positive for Salmonella. Former workers at the Texas plant interviewed by The New York Times said that the facility was "disgusting". It said the plant shared many of the problems found in the plant in Georgia, including a badly leaking roof and rodent infestation. A former plant manager told Good Morning America that he had repeatedly complained to the company owner, Stewart Parnell, about unsanitary conditions, including "water leaking off a roof and bird feces washing in", but Parnell would not authorise money for necessary repairs.

On February 12, 2009, Texan health officials ordered an unprecedented recall of all products ever shipped from the Texas plant since it opened in 2005, after discovering that the plant's air-handling system was drawing in debris from a crawl space containing "dead rodents, rodent excrement and bird feathers" into production areas. State health officials said they issued the sweeping recall because they did not know how long the unsanitary conditions had existed at the plant.

Virginia 
The PCA's peanut blanching operation in Suffolk, Virginia, employed 13 workers and was shut down the day PCA filed for bankruptcy.

Criminal proceedings

Georgia Investigation
Tommy Irvin, commissioner of the Georgia Department of Agriculture (GDA), requested criminal investigation of the Georgia Bureau of Investigation (GBI) as the organization responsible for inspections contracted by the FDA. GDA and GBI officials had said they would consider pursuing manslaughter charges if federal authorities did not take up the case. On January 30, 2009, federal health officials announced that a criminal investigation had been launched by the U.S. Justice Department for possible prosecution under provisions of the 1938 Federal Food, Drug, and Cosmetic Act. On February 4, Georgia officials said they would not prosecute the company, because the two state laws under consideration (reckless conduct and adulteration of food) were only misdemeanors and would only allow for minor penalties. Vernon Keenan, director of the Georgia Bureau of Investigation, said: "Any potential prosecution is most appropriately handled at the federal level".

Federal Prosecution
On February 9, 2009, the Federal Bureau of Investigation (FBI) announced that it had joined with the FDA's Office of Criminal Investigations (FDA-OCI) as part of a criminal investigation of the company. Search warrants were executed on the Blakely plant, as well as PCA's corporate headquarters in Lynchburg. Following a raid by its agents, the Federal Agents sealed off the Blakely plant. On February 21, 2013, four former officials of the company were named in a 75-count indictment on charges related to Salmonella-tainted peanuts and peanut products. The former processing plant manager for Peanut Corporation, Samuel Lightsey, reached a plea agreement on May 8, 2014. Lightsey was then available to the government as a witness at the trial, scheduled to begin in July 2014.

Convictions
Parnell and his brother were convicted in September 2014 of 71 criminal counts, including conspiracy, fraud and other federal charges. In July 2015, Federal authorities recommended a sentence of life imprisonment for Stewart Parnell. Both  Daniel Kilgore and Samuel Lightsey (both former plant managers at PCA) pleaded guilty on their related charges and became government witnesses in the case, providing testimony during the 2014 trial, for consideration of limited sentencing.

Sentencing
In July 2015, federal authorities recommended a sentence of life imprisonment for Parnell. He faced a statutory maximum of 804 years in prison. On September 21, 2015, Parnell was sentenced to 28 years in prison, the longest punishment ever handed out to a producer in a U.S. foodborne illness case. His brother, Michael Parnell, was sentenced to 20 years in prison, and the plant's former quality assurance manager Mary Wilkerson was sentenced to five years. On October 1, 2015, Samuel Lightsey was sentenced to three years in prison and Daniel Kilgore was sentenced to six years in prison. Both men had agreed to cooperate with the government in exchange for leniency.

U.S. District Judge W. Louis Sands stated during sentencing, "We place faith that no one would intentionally ship products to market that are contaminated…. Consumers are at the mercy of food producers for the safety of the products. These acts [of the convicted PCA executives] were driven by profit and the protection of profit … thus greed."Sands told Stewart Parnell that he had  "taken risks for years," that they were "eventually discovered and traced back" to his corporation, and that, unfortunately, "thousands of people suffered and nine died" from Parnell's knowing disregard for public health and safety.

Judge Sands addressed Mary Wilkerson, Quality Assurance Manager for PCA, "You were aware of what was going on and played a role in concealing the problem. That was not actually a minor role in this case". The PCA case, according to Sands, was not about the "condemnation of peanuts or the peanut industry, but of a few individuals."

The prosecution team asked the court to find that the Parnell brothers were flight risks and to deny them bail while they appeal their convictions. The prosecutors did not ask the same for Wilkerson. Judge Sands dismissed defense team allegations of prosecutorial misconduct and a "less-than-unbiased jury." He also addressed defense objections to the victims' testimony, citing their constitutional rights.  The judge then announced that the character witnesses and families of the two Parnell brothers hurt their argument that the two men would not be a flight risk by talking about Stewart Parnell's hobby of being a licensed pilot and flying all over the country, their family resources, and their many connections around the world. Judge Sands ordered that the two Parnell brothers be taken into custody of the U.S. Marshals while allowing bail for Wilkerson (stating that she did not pose the same flight risk without the same access to resources) until the Bureau of Prisons directs her to appear at a specified time and place to begin her sentence.

Bankruptcy
On February 13, 2009, less than 24 hours after the Texas recall, Peanut Corporation of America announced it was permanently halting operations and filing for Chapter 7 bankruptcy. Bankruptcy lawyer Andrew Goldstein said that the company had considered filing for Chapter 11, but decided to liquidate because all of its plants had been shut down and there was no way it could carry on business. Consumers Union criticised the move, saying that the bankruptcy filing would shield the company from liability suits, although in reality, the bankruptcy filing merely delays any claims against the company.

Other federal action 
Parnell served on the U.S. Department of Agriculture's Peanut Standards Board, which sets quality and handling standards for peanuts. He was first appointed by Agriculture Secretary Mike Johanns to the position in 2005, and was reappointed for another term that would have expired in 2011, but on February 5, 2009, the USDA announced that the new Agriculture Secretary Tom Vilsack had removed Parnell from the board.

On February 5, 2009, the U.S. Department of Agriculture (USDA) announced that Peanut Corporation of America and a subsidiary, Tidewater Blanching LLC, were banned from all federal government contracts and subcontracts for one year, saying the company: "lacks business integrity and business honesty, which seriously and directly hinders its ability to do business with the federal government."

Owner
Peanut Corporation of America was founded and originally owned by Hugh Parnell, father of Stewart Parnell, but by the time of the contamination scandal had passed to Stewart as sole owner, and as president and CEO of the company.

Hugh Parnell started in the peanut business with Stewart Parnell and his two younger brothers in 1977; they took a struggling, $50,000-a-year peanut roasting operation and turned it into a $30 million business before selling the business in 1994–1995, after which Stewart Parnell continued on as a consultant until re-buying the Gorman, Texas, plant in 2000. In 2001, he bought the Blakely, Georgia, operation, when its operations consisted only of roasting and blanching peanuts. Parnell tripled revenue at the Blakely plant by 2004, turning its first profit in 15 years, with production regularly surpassing 2.5 million pounds of peanuts per month. However, the FDA did not know that the plant manufactured peanut butter until the 2008-2009 outbreak.

The Parnells ran PCA on a very tight budget. The company under Hugh Parnell operated a bare-bones front office and used minimum-wage labor, a style that was continued by Stewart Parnell, who ran PCA from a converted garage behind his home in an upscale suburb outside of Lynchburg, Virginia, and continued to rely on minimum-wage labor.

Despite more than 12 tests between 2007 and 2008 that showed Salmonella contamination in his company's products, Parnell wrote an email to company employees on January 12, 2009, that stated, "We have never found any salmonella at all. No salmonella has been found anywhere in our products or in our plants." Parnell ordered products identified with Salmonella to be shipped and complained that tests discovering the contaminated food were "costing us huge $$$$$." In a June 2008 email exchange, Parnell complained to a worker after being notified that Salmonella had been found in more products. "I go thru this about once a week," he wrote. "I will hold my breath ... again." After the company was identified as the source of the outbreak, Parnell pressed federal regulators to allow him to continue using peanuts from the tainted plant. He wrote that company executives "desperately at least need to turn the raw peanuts on our floor into money."

Under Congressional subpoena, Parnell on February 11 appeared with his plant manager before a House Energy and Commerce subcommittee, but repeatedly refused to testify, citing their Fifth Amendment protection against self-incrimination.  Among the questions they refused to answer was one from Rep. Greg Walden (R-Ore.): "In this container, are products that have your ingredients in them, some of which are on the recall list, some of which are probably contaminated. It seems like from what we've read you were willing to send out that peanut base that went into these ingredients. I just wonder, would either of you be willing to take the lid off and eat any of these products now like the people on the panel ahead of you, their relatives, their loved ones did?" Walden revealed an e-mail from Parnell, who, referring to products that had tested positive for Salmonella, wrote: "Let's turn them loose."

Media
In 2015, Food Republic produced and aired Food Crimes: "P.B. & Jail."

On July 3, 2017, CNBC aired an episode of American Greed: "From Peanuts to Sick Millions” [Documentary / Crime]. Season ll, Episode AG 141.

A Food Safety Expert / Professor of food policy & regulatory compliance wrote a series of articles based on interviewing participants and being in the courtroom during the sentencing. He also focused on this event in his book on food safety

References

External links
 Peanut Corporation of America E-Mails
 Peanut Butter Product Recalls (2009-01-29) - FDA
 Multistate Outbreak of Salmonella Typhimurium Infections Linked to Peanut Butter, 2008-2009 (FINAL UPDATE) - CDC
 Peanut Corporation of America
 Peanut Corporation of America
 PCA criminal case
 PCA trial
 PCA criminal appeal
 Stewart Parnell | Fortune 
 Peanut Corporation of America — Blakely, Georgia Plant — archived from 2009.

Peanut production
Defunct agriculture companies of the United States
Food safety scandals
Early County, Georgia
Lynchburg, Virginia
American companies established in 1976
Agriculture companies established in 1976
Food and drink companies established in 1976
Manufacturing companies established in 1976
Food and drink companies disestablished in 2009
Manufacturing companies disestablished in 2009
1976 establishments in Virginia
2009 disestablishments in Virginia
Companies that have filed for Chapter 7 bankruptcy
Defunct manufacturing companies based in Virginia
Defunct food and drink companies of the United States